The 2010 Georgia House of Representatives elections occurred on November 2, 2010 to elect the members to the Georgia House of Representatives. All 180 seats in the state House were up for two year terms. The winners of this election cycle served in the 151st Georgia General Assembly. It was the last election to the House prior to the 2010 redistricting cycle based on the 2010 United States census.

Retiring incumbent Representatives

Democrats
 Rob Teilhet (District-40): To run for state Attorney General
 Georganna Sinkfield (District-60): To run for Secretary of State of Georgia
 Ron Dodson (District-75): Retiring, not seeking other office
 Mike Glanton (District 76): To run for Georgia State Senate in state Senate District 44.
 Kevin Levitas (District 82): Retired after filing deadline passed.
 Randal Mangham (District 94): To run for Governor of Georgia
 DuBose Porter (District-143): To run for Governor of Georgia.
 Jay Shaw (District-176): Retiring upon election to Georgia Department of Transportation Board

Republicans
 Barry Loudermilk (District-14): To run for Georgia State Senate in state Senate District 52.
 Mark Butler (District-18): To run for Labor Commissioner
 Tom Knox (District-24): To run for Insurance Commissioner
 Mark Burkhalter (District-50): Retiring, not seeking other office
 Fran Millar (District-79): To run for Georgia State Senate in state Senate District 40.
 Bobby Reese (District-98): Retired to run for U.S. House in Georgia's 9th congressional district. He has since withdrawn from the special election, but will still run in the regularly scheduled election
 Mike Coan (District-101): Retiring upon Governor Sonny Perdue's recommendation to head Supplemental Insurance Trust Fund
 Clay Cox (District-102): To run for U.S. House in Georgia's 7th congressional district
 Melvin Everson (District-106): To run for Labor Commissioner
 John Lunsford (District-110): retiring, not seeking other office
 Jeff May (District-111): To run for Georgia Public Service Commission
 Bob Smith (District-113): Retiring, not seeking other office.
 Jim Cole (District-125): Retiring, not seeking other office
 Austin Scott (District-153): To run for U.S. House in Georgia's 8th congressional district
 Bob Lane (District-158): Retiring, not seeking other office.
 Burke Day (District-163): Retiring, not seeking other office.
 Terry E. Barnard (District-166): Retiring, not seeking other office.
 Mike Keown (District-173): To run for U.S. House in Georgia's 2nd congressional district
 Jerry Keen (District-179): Retiring, not seeking other office.

Incumbents defeated in primary

 Daniel Stout (R-District-19) (elected in 2010) was defeated by Paulette Braddock
 Don Wix (D-District-33) (elected in 1998) was defeated by David Wilkerson
 Toney Collins (D-District-95) (elected in 2008) was defeated by Pam Dickerson
 Cecily Hill (R-District-180) (elected in 2002) was defeated by Jason Spencer

Election Results
On election day, Republicans made a net gain of three seats. However Republicans would make additional gains when Democratic Representatives changed their party affiliation, though this is not recorded in the table below.

Vacancies (To be filled before November)
All the following special elections occurred on May 11 with runoffs to be held on June 8 if necessary.

House
 House district 12: Representative Tom Graves (R) resigned to focus on his campaign for the United States House of Representatives in Georgia's 9th congressional district.

See also
 United States elections, 2010
 United States House of Representatives elections in Georgia, 2010
 Georgia elections, 2010
 Georgia gubernatorial election, 2010
 Georgia lieutenant gubernatorial election, 2010
 Georgia Secretary of State election, 2010
 Georgia House of Representatives election, 2010
 Elections in Georgia (U.S. state)

References

External links
 Secretary of State of Georgia elections website - Voter registration information, polling place lookup, and election results.
 Imagine Election - Find out which candidates will appear on your ballot - search by address or zip code.

2010 Georgia (U.S. state) elections
Georgia House of Representatives elections
Georgia House of Representatives